Sean Areon Dockery (born January 5, 1983) is a retired American professional basketball player. He has played professionally in Canada, France, Romania and Germany, as well as in the U.S. Dockery was regarded as one of the nation's top high school point guards when he came to Duke University.  He split time at point guard with Greg Paulus in his senior year.

Senior year
Dockery shot 46.5% in his last season, while averaging 7.1 points, 3.0 rebounds, 2.6 assists, and a team-leading 1.7 steals per game, while starting in 32 of 36 games.  His 194 career steals rank him 11th in Duke history. Dockery is perhaps best remembered for his half-court shot at the buzzer to beat Virginia Tech at Cameron Indoor Stadium during his senior year.

Professional career
Before the 2006 NBA Draft, Dockery was invited to the Portsmouth Invitational Tournament soon after the Blue Devils' loss to LSU. Dockery posted averages of 13.7 points, 8.3 assists, 3.0 rebounds and 1.3 steals in the PIT. Dockery also played in the Orlando Pre-Draft Camp. He posted averages of 3.7 points, 4.3 assists and 1.7 steals while playing through a pulled hip flexor. Due to these performances, some considered Dockery a potential late second round draft pick.  However, Dockery was not drafted and has never played for an NBA team. He has played mostly in Europe. On May 5, 2008, the Edmonton Chill of the International Basketball League announced that it released Dockery.

Since Dockery's last season playing professional basketball overseas he returned to his hometown of Chicago, IL where he has established himself as a Personal Trainer/ Basketball Skills & Development Instructor founding "Dockery University".  In 2016, Dockery returned to the hardwood to compete in "TBT" aka The Basketball Tournament with the Midwest Dream Squad. In 19 minutes of play Dockery scored 10 points and added 1 steal in 19 minutes of play. As of the 2016–2017 NBA season Dockery can now be seen behind the bench of the San Antonio Spurs as he has been hired on as an Advance Scout for the 5 time NBA Champions.

References

External links
 Duke University page
 Career Statistics

1983 births
Living people
American expatriate basketball people in Canada
American expatriate basketball people in France
American expatriate basketball people in Germany
American expatriate basketball people in Romania
American men's basketball players
Artland Dragons players
Basketball players from Chicago
Brose Bamberg players
CSU Asesoft Ploiești players
Duke Blue Devils men's basketball players
Étendard de Brest players
Fort Worth Flyers players
McDonald's High School All-Americans
Point guards